The Hero's Farewell is the tenth episode of the fourth series of the period drama Upstairs, Downstairs. It first aired on 16 November 1974 on ITV.

Background
The Hero's Farewell was recorded in the studio on 8 and 9 August 1974. Rosemary Anne Sisson used the diaries of Lady Cynthia Asquith as inspiration for this episode, as she had for her earlier episode Tug of War. It is set shortly before October 1917.

Cast
Gordon Jackson - Hudson
Joan Benham - Lady Prudence Fairfax
Angela Baddeley - Mrs Bridges
Jean Marsh - Rose
David Langton - Richard Bellamy
Lesley-Anne Down - Georgina Worsley
Christopher Beeny - Edward
Jacqueline Tong - Daisy
Jenny Tomasin - Ruby
Christopher Good - Major Philip Hanning
Robin Bailey - Gerald Maitland
Phyllida Law - Lady Constance Weir
Fanny Rowe - Duchess of Mitcham
Alfred Maron - Carpenter

Plot
Lady Prudence brings Mr. Gerald Maitland, a famous actor, to 165, Eaton Place after German bombing has destroyed many of the prominent houses in London, and persuades Richard to hold a series of historical tableau, entitled The Hero's Farewell, in aid of the Red Cross. Lady Prudence knows that Hazel would never agree, she has used the opportunity of Hazel being in Eastbourne. Lady Prudence and Gerald Maitland then organise the tableau, with tableaux of "Anthony and Cleopatra", "Lord Nelson and Lady Hamilton" and "Columbus and Queen Isabella". Georgina is home on leave and she is chosen to portray Florence Nightingale, while Ruby is to portray a Belgian peasant girl with Lady Prudence as a German officer. Lady Prudence asks Hudson to wear a kilt to show in the guests, but he refuses to.

Meanwhile downstairs, Mrs Bridges and Ruby go to a "War Cooking" lecture after pressure from Mr Hudson. Mrs Bridges starts to make meals from leftovers, including "Win the War Pie", much to everyone's distaste.

At the dress rehearsal for the historical tableaux, an air raid strikes and Ruby becomes hysterical. The whole household goes down to the basement, while Hudson goes out in his role as a special constable. When he comes back, he faints having been hit by a piece of shrapnel and goes to hospital. The day after the raid, a telegraph arrives; James is "missing believed killed".

References
Notes

Sources
Richard Marson, "Inside UpDown - The Story of Upstairs, Downstairs", Kaleidoscope Publishing, 2005
Updown.org.uk - Upstairs, Downstairs Fansite

Upstairs, Downstairs (series 4) episodes
1974 British television episodes
Fiction set in 1917